Hamcearca is a commune in Tulcea County, Northern Dobruja, Romania. It is composed of four villages: Balabancea, Căprioara (historical name: Geaferca-Rusă), Hamcearca and Nifon.

The commune formerly included Taiţa village, mainly Russian-inhabited prior to 1877, but this had been depopulated by 1930.

Reportedly, the commune's name derives from Hamcerencu, the surname of the brothers who settled there around 1812.

References

Communes in Tulcea County
Localities in Northern Dobruja